Broken Sword may refer to:

 Broken Sword, an adventure game series by Revolution Software
 Broken Sword: The Shadow of the Templars, the first instalment in the series
 Broken Sword II: The Smoking Mirror, the second instalment in the series
 Broken Sword: The Sleeping Dragon, the third instalment in the series
 Broken Sword: The Angel of Death, the fourth instalment in the series
 Broken Sword 5, the fifth instalment in the series
 The Broken Sword, a 1954 fantasy novel by the American writer Poul Anderson
 Brokensword, Ohio, a small community in Crawford County, Ohio, United States
 "Broken Sword" (Chinese: cánjiàn) is the name of a lead character played by Tony Leung Chiu Wai in the Zhang Yimou film Hero
 Narsil, a fictional sword in J.R.R. Tolkien's books, held by King Elendil and broken by Sauron, later reforged and renamed Andúril.